The Joseph Andrews House is a historic house at 258 Linden Street in Waltham, Massachusetts.  Built in 1851, it is one of the city's oldest examples of Italianate architecture, and was one of the first houses built in Linden Street.  It was listed on the National Register of Historic Places in 1989.

Description and history
The Joseph Andrews House stands in a residential area just east of the campus of Bentley University, on the west side of Linden Street between Floral Drive and Linden Circle.  It is a -story wood-frame structure, with a gabled roof and clapboarded exterior.  It has Italianate styling, featuring wide eaves with paired brackets, paneled corner boards, and an entry framed by sidelight and transom windows.

The area that is now Linden Street was developed by Charles Harrington, who acquired land from the Lyman Estate 1845, and laid the street out through its middle. Harrington built this house about 1851 for Joseph Andrews, an elder in the local Swedenborgian Church; it was one of three houses he built on the street. That land was subdivided in 1950, when Cedar Hill Lane (just west of Linden Street) was laid out. The house was moved forward in its lot, removing its rear wings in the process. Prominent owners of the house include a superior court judge and the owner of Boston-based maker of agricultural implements.

See also
National Register of Historic Places listings in Waltham, Massachusetts

References

Houses in Waltham, Massachusetts
Houses on the National Register of Historic Places in Waltham, Massachusetts
Italianate architecture in Massachusetts
Houses completed in 1851
1851 establishments in Massachusetts